Coimbatore North or 'Coimbatore (North)' is a legislative assembly constituency in the Indian state of Tamil Nadu. Its State Assembly Constituency number is 118. It covers parts of Coimbatore. Coimbatore North assembly constituency is a part of the Coimbatore parliamentary constituency. It is a newly created constituency after 2008 delimitation. Coimbatore (North) will be one of 17 assembly constituencies to have VVPAT facility with EVMs in 2016 Tamil Nadu Legislative Assembly election. It is one of the 234 State Legislative Assembly Constituencies in Tamil Nadu.

Members

Tamil Nadu - Coimbatore (North)

Election Results

2021

2016

2011

References

External links
 

Assembly constituencies of Tamil Nadu
Government of Coimbatore